Monções is a municipality in the state of São Paulo in Brazil. The population is 2,267 (2020 est.) in an area of 104 km². The elevation is 406 m.

References

Municipalities in São Paulo (state)

pt:Monções